Fengyu Cave is a cave in Dongli Village, Sanhe Township, Lipu. It has an entire length of 5.3 kilometers and a subterranean river of 3.3 kilometers and runs through nine mountains. One hall is 25,500 square meters large. It is inhabited by red blind fish. The subterranean river is fed by the Sanhe River (三河), a tributary of the Lipu River (荔浦河), through karst fissures.

References

Tourist attractions in Guilin
Caves of Guangxi